Muhammad Akhtar may refer to:
 Muhammad Akhtar (biochemist) (born 1933), British-Pakistani biochemist
 Muhammad Akhtar (wrestler) (born 1930), Pakistani wrestler